Edmond Miellet (1880–1953) was a French politician. He served as a member of the Chamber of Deputies from 1919 to 1942, representing Territoire de Belfort.

References

1880 births
1942 deaths
People from the Territoire de Belfort
Politicians from Bourgogne-Franche-Comté
Radical Party (France) politicians
Members of the 12th Chamber of Deputies of the French Third Republic
Members of the 13th Chamber of Deputies of the French Third Republic
Members of the 14th Chamber of Deputies of the French Third Republic
Members of the 15th Chamber of Deputies of the French Third Republic
Members of the 16th Chamber of Deputies of the French Third Republic